The Day Shall Come is a 2019 comedy film directed by Chris Morris and written by Morris and Jesse Armstrong. It stars Marchánt Davis, Anna Kendrick, Danielle Brooks and Denis O'Hare. The film satirises a real-life FBI sting operation.

It had its world premiere at South by Southwest on 11 March 2019. It was released in the United States on 27 September 2019, by IFC Films, and in the United Kingdom on 11 October 2019, by Entertainment One.

Plot

Moses Al Shabazz is the impoverished leader of a small religious commune, the Star of Six, in Miami. The commune has three other members: Moses's wife Venus, and followers X and Afrika. It worships deities including Allah, "Black Santa", and General Toussaint Louverture. Moses preaches a black uprising against the white oppressors, but opposes the use of firearms. He has been prescribed anti-psychotic medication, but does not take it, as it "makes him drowsy".

Agent Kendra Glack of the FBI comes across one of Moses's live-streamed sermons, and decides that he will make an ideal dupe on whom to pin revolutionary activities. When Moses is served an eviction notice by his landlord, Kendra sends Reza, a pedophilic shopkeeper now working undercover for the FBI, to claim that his relative, a sheikh affiliated with Al-Qaeda, would be willing to supply money and firearms to Moses. Reza sets up a meeting between Moses and the supposed sheikh (in fact another FBI informant, Nura), but Moses initially asks only for farm equipment and a horse. However, having appreciated how much money the guns represent, he subsequently agrees to accept 50 Kalashnikov rifles.

Venus is horrified at these dealings, and leaves the commune with their daughter, even though Moses has promised not to use the guns. Moses witnesses a lightning strike destroy a crane, which he interprets as a sign from God. On the day of the exchange, the FBI prepare to arrest him for the illegal gun deal, but he rides to the FBI headquarters on his horse and attempts to turn in the dealers for a reward. He meets with Kendra before leaving: she shows sympathy for his situation, but says she can't help him. When Moses returns to his commune, he finds his followers have been evicted. His landlord agrees to let him return in exchange for procuring uranium from the sheikh; and the FBI sees this as an opportunity to have him arrested for attempting to use a nuclear device.

Moses makes a deal to sell the uranium to a group of neo-Nazis for $100,000, but instead of procuring the real uranium has his followers fill the canisters with urine and beans. The neo-Nazis are actually undercover police officers, and in having Moses contact them, the FBI cross over into police territory, leading the Miami police to take over the case and attempt to arrest Moses, X, Afrika, and Moses's landlord at the uranium sale. Kendra is able to persuade the police to stand down and let Moses, X, and Afrika go, while arresting the landlord. Moses believes he is now off the hook; but as he drives his bus back into town to meet his wife and daughter at a donut shop, the police give chase.

The Miami police have called a nuclear emergency, forcing Kendra to do likewise in order to retain control of the situation. On their way to the donut shop, Kendra's superior Andy hints that it would all be easier if Moses were shot, prompting Kendra to rethink her position. At the shop, a policeman's gun goes off by mistake, sending everyone running for cover. Reza, who is also present, tries to give Moses a fake rocket launcher in order to give the FBI an excuse to arrest him, but Moses pretends to be an undercover cop and arrests Reza, who Afrika accidentally shoots in the head with a toy crossbow. Kendra enters the shop and asks Moses to stand down, but he attempts to fire the rocket launcher at her and her accompanying officers, allowing the FBI to arrest him and his followers. As he is being led away, Kendra promises Moses that his daughter will be cared for.

The end credits state that all FBI personnel involved in the case were promoted, while Moses and his followers were given 20 to 35 years in prison on plea bargains with no trial. Venus was given 15 years for aiding a terrorist organization.

Cast
 Marchánt Davis as Moses Al Shabaz, an impoverished preacher
 Anna Kendrick as Kendra Glack, an FBI operative
 Danielle Brooks as Venus Al Shabaz, Moses's wife
 Denis O'Hare as Andy Mudd, Glack's boss
 Jim Gaffigan as Lemmy, a neo-Nazi
 Miles Robbins as Josh 
 Pej Vahdat as Nura
 Adam David Thompson as Stevie
 Kayvan Novak as Reza the Shopkeeper, a pedophile working for Glack
 Mousa Kraish as Malik
 James Adomian as Settmonk, a police officer
 Malcolm Mays as X

Production
The film was shot in secret, in the Dominican Republic in 2017 and 2018. Additional photography took place in March 2018.

Release
The film had its world premiere at South by Southwest on 11 March 2019. It was released in the United States on 27 September 2019. and in the United Kingdom on 11 October 2019.

Reception 
The website's critical consensus reads, "Absurd yet anchored in knotty real-world themes, The Day Shall Come adds another bleakly funny satire to director/co-writer Christopher Morris' filmography."
On Metacritic, the film has a weighted average score of 71% based on reviews from 21 critics, indicating "generally favorable reviews".

John DeFore of The Hollywood Reporter wrote: "The film represents another leap forward for [Morris], who has had a long career in the U.K. but whose work may always remain too biting to find broad success Stateside."
Peter Debruge of Variety praised the performance of "talented newcomer Marchánt Davis" but was critical of Kendrick for not being a good fit for this particular role.

References

External links
 
 

2019 films
American black comedy films
British black comedy films
Australian black comedy films
American comedy thriller films
British comedy thriller films
Australian comedy thriller films
Film4 Productions films
FilmNation Entertainment films
Entertainment One films
IFC Films films
Films produced by Iain Canning
Films produced by Emile Sherman
Films shot in the Dominican Republic
2010s English-language films
2010s American films
2010s British films